Nightingales is a British situation comedy set around the antics of three security guards working the night shift. It was written by Paul Makin and produced by Alomo Productions for Channel 4 in 1990.

Plot
Nightingales revolved around the jobs of three bored nightwatchmen working in a deserted office block, the location of which is never revealed, although exterior shots are of Beneficial House located on Paradise Circus in Birmingham City Centre.

A typical episode involved both very naturalistic dialogue — and the kind of claustrophobic studio-setting that prevailed in shows such as Steptoe and Son — combined with the surreal.

Nightingales ran for two series totalling 13 episodes from 27 February 1990 to 10 February 1993. The long delay was prompted by Channel 4 executive Seamus Cassidy who was not happy with the proposed scripts for the second series and it was nearly three years before it was given the go-ahead. The theme tune was a version of the song "A Nightingale Sang in Berkeley Square" sung by Lindsay. Writer Paul Makin went on to write more conventional comedies like Goodnight Sweetheart. A US remake (titled "In Security") was piloted but never commissioned.

Cast and characters
 Robert Lindsay as Carter, a pseudo-intellectual whose aspirations were invariably frustrated.
 David Threlfall as "Ding Dong" Bell, a moronic thug who is somewhat in awe of Carter.
 James Ellis as Sarge, an impossibly optimistic veteran watchman (who is occasionally used to parody the naive optimism of Dixon of Dock Green).
 Smith, a fourth character who was dead throughout the first series, the other characters kept his body in the building so that they could claim his salary.

Guest characters included Piper (Edward Burnham), the elderly cleaning man; Eric the werewolf (Ian Sears); an additional security guard who was a gorilla; and Mary the Christmas Allegory (Lia Williams), who gave birth to consumer products.

Episodes

Series one

Series two

External links
 
 
 
 http://www.offthetelly.co.uk/?page_id=326 - Off the Telly series overview

Channel 4 sitcoms
1990s British sitcoms
1990 British television series debuts
1993 British television series endings
1990s British black comedy television series
English-language television shows
Television series by Fremantle (company)
British surreal comedy television series
Television about werewolves